Täsch is a municipality in Visp, Valais, Switzerland.

Tasch may also refer to:

 Tasch Peak, in Antarctica
 Täsch railway station
 Kûrvi-Tasch, a fictional character from Tintin
 Paul Tasch (1910-2001) U.S. paleontologist

See also

 
 
 Tack (disambiguation)
 Tach (disambiguation)
 Tash (disambiguation)
 Toch (disambiguation)
 Tosh (disambiguation)